Jesús David Peña (born 8 May 1998 in Zipaquirá) is a Colombian professional road racing cyclist, who currently rides for UCI WorldTeam .

Major results

2019
 1st  Overall Vuelta de la Juventud de Colombia
1st Stage 4
 7th Overall Giro Ciclistico d'Italia
2020
 National Under-23 Road Championships
6th Road race
8th Time trial
2021
 1st  Overall Vuelta de la Juventud de Colombia
1st Stages 1 & 2

References

External links

2000 births
Living people
Colombian male cyclists
People from Cundinamarca Department
21st-century Colombian people